The 2020 San Diego Padres season was the 52nd season of the San Diego Padres franchise, the 52nd in the National League and the Padres' 17th Season at Petco Park. The Padres were managed by Jayce Tingler, in his first season as the Padres Manager, and  played their home games at Petco Park as members of the Major League Baseball's National League West Division.

On March 12, 2020, MLB announced that because of the ongoing COVID-19 pandemic, the start of the regular season would be delayed by at least two weeks in addition to the remainder of spring training being cancelled. Four days later, it was announced that the start of the season would be pushed back indefinitely due to the recommendation made by the CDC to restrict events of more than 50 people for eight weeks. 

On June 23, commissioner Rob Manfred unilaterally implemented a 60-game season. Players reported to training camps on July 1 in order to resume spring training and prepare for a July 24 Opening Day.

The Padres became the first team in MLB history to hit a grand slam in four consecutive games, doing so in each of their four games against the Texas Rangers between August 17 and 20.

On September 13, the Padres won their 31st game of the season, ensuring that they would finish with a winning record for the first time since 2010. On September 20, the Padres beat the Seattle Mariners 4–1 to clinch their first postseason appearance since 2006. They defeated the St. Louis Cardinals in the 2020 National League Wild Card Series. The Padres won their first postseason series since the 1998 NLCS. Game 2 of their NL Wild Card Series was also the first home postseason win since Petco Park opened and since Game 4 of the aforementioned 1998 NLCS. The Padres winning Game 3 of the NL Wild Card Series also clinched their first postseason series at home since Game 5 of the 1984 NLCS (also a winner-take-all game). The Padres were defeated by the eventual World Series champions Los Angeles Dodgers in the 2020 National League Division Series at Globe Life Field.

Previous season 
The Padres finished the 2019 Season 70–92 in fifth place in the West Division. The Padres extended its 10-year streak of a losing record and a 15-year nonplayoff streak.

Offseason 
October 31: Craig Stammen, Adam Warren, Robbie Erlin, and Aaron Loup all elect free agency.
October 31: Padres trade Travis Jankowski to Reds for future considerations.
November 4: Padres designates Jacob Nix, Seth Mejias-Brean, Carl Edwards Jr., and Eric Yardley for assignment.
November 20: Padres designated Nick Martini for assignment.
November 20: Padres selected the contract of Jorge Ona from Amarillo Sod Poodles.
November 27: Padres traded player to be named later, Eric Lauer and Luis Urias to Brewers for Trent Grisham and Zach Davies.
November 27: Padres designated Pedro Avila for assignment.
November 27: Padres signed free agent Drew Pomeranz.
December 2: Padres traded Austin Allen and player to be named later to Athletics for Jurickson Profar.
December 6: Padres traded Hunter Renfroe, Xavier Edwards, and player to be named later to Rays for Tommy Pham and Jake Cronenworth.
December 23: Padres signed free agent Pierce Johnson.
January 17: Padres signed free agent Craig Stammen.
February 8: Padres traded Manuel Margot and Logan Driscoll to Rays for Emilio Pagan
February 12: Padres claimed 2B Breyvic Valera off waivers from Blue Jays.

Season standings

National League West

National League Wild Card

Record vs. opponents

Game log
On April 18–19, the Padres were supposed to play against the Arizona Diamondbacks in the Mexico Series in Mexico City. But due to the pandemic, the MLB cancelled the series.

|-style="background:#cfc;"
| 1 || July 24 || Diamondbacks || 7–2 || Paddack (1–0) || Bumgarner (0–1) || — || 1–0 || W1
|-style="background:#cfc;"
| 2 || July 25 || Diamondbacks || 5–1 || Lamet (1–0) || Ray (0–1) || — || 2–0 || W2
|-style="background:#fbb;"
| 3 || July 26 || Diamondbacks || 3–4 || Bradley (1–0) || Yates (0–1) || — || 2–1 || L1
|-style="background:#cfc;"
| 4 || July 27 || Diamondbacks || 6–2 || Quantrill (1–0) || Weaver (0–1) || — || 3–1 || W1
|-style="background:#cfc;"
| 5 || July 28 || @ Giants || 5–3 || Davies (1–0) || Samardzija (0–1) || Pomeranz (1) || 4–1 || W2
|-style="background:#fbb;"
| 6 || July 29 || @ Giants || 6–7 || Rogers (1–1) || Strahm (0–1) || — || 4–2 || L1
|-style="background:#cfc;"
| 7 || July 30 || @ Giants || 12–7  || Johnson (1–0) || Rogers (1–2) || — || 5–2 || W1
|-style="background:#cfc;"
| 8 || July 31 || @ Rockies || 8–7 || Stammen (1–1) || Davis (0–1) || Pomeranz (2) || 6–2 || W2
|-

|-style="background:#fbb;"
| 9 || August 1 || @ Rockies || 1–6 || Freeland (2–0) || Lucchesi (0–1) || — || 6–3 || L1
|-style="background:#fbb;"
| 10 || August 2 || @ Rockies || 6–9 || Senzatela (2–0) || Davies (1–1) || Díaz (1) || 6–4 || L2
|-style="background:#cfc;"
| 11 || August 3 || Dodgers || 5–4 || Paddack (2–0) || Graterol (1–2) || Yates (1) || 7–4 || W1
|-style="background:#fbb;"
| 12 || August 4 || Dodgers || 2–5 || May (1–0) || Stammen (1–1) || Jansen (3) || 7–5 || L1
|-style="background:#fbb;"
| 13 || August 5 || Dodgers || 6–7 || Stripling (3–0) || Richards (0–1) || Jansen (4) || 7–6 || L2
|-style="background:#cfc;"
| 14 || August 7 || Diamondbacks || 3–0 || Davies (2–1) || Weaver (0–3) || Yates (2) || 8–6 || W1
|-style="background:#fbb;"
| 15 || August 8 || Diamondbacks || 2–3 || Kelly (2–1) || Paddack (2–1) || Bradley (3) || 8–7 || L1 
|-style="background:#cfc;"
| 16 || August 9 || Diamondbacks || 9–5 || Lamet (2–0) || Bumgarner (0–3) || — || 9–7 || W1
|-style="background:#cfc;"
| 17 || August 10 || @ Dodgers || 2–1 || Quantrill (2–0) || May (1–1) || Pomeranz (3) || 10–7 || W2
|-style="background:#cfc;"
| 18 || August 11 || @ Dodgers || 6–2 || Richards (1–1) || Stripling (3–1) || Pomeranz (4) || 11–7 || W3
|-style="background:#fbb;"
| 19 || August 12 || @ Dodgers || 0–6 || Treinen (1–1) || Davies (2–2) || — || 11–8 || L1
|-style="background:#fbb;"
| 20 || August 13 || @ Dodgers || 2–11 || Urías (2–0) || Paddack (2–2) || — || 11–9 || L2
|-style="background:#fbb;"
| 21 || August 14 || @ Diamondbacks || 1–5 || Kelly (3–1) || Lamet (2–1) || — || 11–10 || L3
|-style="background:#fbb;"
| 22 || August 15 || @ Diamondbacks || 6–7 || Crichton (1–0) || Johnson (1–1) || Bradley (5) || 11–11 || L4
|-style="background:#fbb;"
| 23 || August 16 || @ Diamondbacks || 4–5 || Clarke (1–0) || Pagán (0–1) || Bradley (6) || 11–12 || L5
|-style="background:#cfc;"
| 24 || August 17 || @ Rangers || 14–4 || Davies (3–2) || Lyles (1–2) || — || 12–12 || W1
|-style="background:#cfc;"
| 25 || August 18 || @ Rangers || 6–4 || Stammen (2–1) || Minor (0–4) || Quantrill (1) || 13–12 || W2
|-style="background:#cfc;"
| 26 || August 19 || Rangers || 6–3  || Hill (1–0) || Montero (0–1) || — || 14–12 || W3
|-style="background:#cfc;"
| 27 || August 20 || Rangers || 8–7  || Johnson (2–1) || García (0–1) || — || 15–12 || W4
|-style="background:#cfc;"
| 28 || August 21 || Astros || 4–3 || Guerra (1–0) || McCullers Jr. (2–2) || Pagán (1) || 16–12 || W5
|-style="background:#cfc;"
| 29 || August 22 || Astros || 13–2 || Davies (4–2) || Bielak (3–1) || — || 17–12 || W6
|-style="background:#cfc;"
| 30 || August 23 || Astros || 5–3 || Stammen (3–1) || Paredes (0–1) || Pagán (2) || 18–12 || W7
|-style="background:#fbb;"
| 31 || August 25 || Mariners || 3–8 || Gonzales (3–2) || Paddack (2–3) || — || 18–13 || L1
|- style="background:#bbb;"
| — || August 26 || Mariners || colspan=7 | Postponed (Boycotts due to Jacob Blake shooting); Makeup: August 27 
|-style="background:#cfc;"
| 32 || August 27 || Mariners  || 10–7  || Johnson (3–1) || Williams (0–1) || — || 19–13 || W1
|-style="background:#fbb;"
| 33 || August 27 || Mariners  || 3–8  || Kikuchi (1–2) || Richards (1–2) || — || 19–14 || L1
|-style="background:#cfc;"
| 34 || August 28 || @ Rockies || 10–4 || Davies (5–2) || Hoffman (2–1) || — || 20–14 || W1
|-style="background:#fbb;"
| 35 || August 29 || @ Rockies || 3–4 || Bard (2–2) || Stammen (3–2) || — || 20–15 || L1
|-style="background:#cfc;"
| 36 || August 30 || @ Rockies || 13–2 || Paddack (3–3) || Castellani (1–2) || — || 21–15 || W1
|-style="background:#cfc;"
| 37 || August 31 || @ Rockies || 6–0 || Morejón (1–0) || Márquez (2–5) || — || 22–15 || W2
|-

|-style="background:#cfc;"
| 38 || September 2 || @ Angels || 11–4 || Hill (2–0) || Buttrey (1–2) || — || 23–15 || W3
|-style="background:#fbb;"
| 39 || September 3 || @ Angels || 0–2 || Heaney (3–2) || Clevinger (1–2) ||  Peña (1) || 23–16 || L1
|-style="background:#cfc;"
| 40 || September 4 || @ Athletics || 7–0 || Davies (6–2) || Luzardo (2–2) || — || 24–16 || W1
|-style="background:#fbb;"
| 41 || September 5 || @ Athletics || 4–8 || Manaea (3–2) || Paddack (3–4) || — || 24–17 || L1
|-style="background:#cfc;"
| 42 || September 6  || @ Athletics || 5–3 || Richards (2–2) || Fiers (4–2) || Rosenthal (8) || 25–17 || W1
|-style="background:#cfc;"
| 43 || September 7 || Rockies || 1–0 || Pomeranz (1–0) || Estévez (1–2) || — || 26–17 || W2
|-style="background:#cfc;"
| 44 || September 8 || Rockies || 14–5 || Clevinger (2–2) || Gonzalez (0–1) || — || 27–17 || W3
|-style="background:#cfc;"
| 45 || September 9 || Rockies || 5–3 || Davies (7–2) || Senzatela (3–2) || Rosenthal (9) || 28–17 || W4 
|-style="background:#cfc;"
| 46 || September 10 || Giants || 6–1 || Morejón (2–0) || Cahill (0–1) || — || 29–17 || W5
|-style="background:#bbb;"
| – || September 11 || Giants || colspan=7 | Postponed (COVID-19); Makeup September 13 
|-style="background:#bbb;"
| – || September 12 || Giants || colspan=7 | Postponed (COVID-19); Makeup September 25 
|-style="background:#cfc;"
| 47 || September 13  || Giants || 6–0  || Clevinger (3–2) || Cueto (2–1) || — || 30–17 || W6
|-style="background:#cfc;"
| 48 || September 13  || Giants || 3–1  || Hill (3–0) || Selman (1–1) || Rosenthal (10) || 31–17 || W7
|-style="background:#cfc;"
| 49 || September 14 || Dodgers || 7–2 || Lamet (3–1) || Kershaw (5–2) || — || 32–17 || W8
|-style="background:#fbb;"
| 50 || September 15 || Dodgers || 1–3 || Gonsolin (1–1) || Davies (7–3) || Jansen (11) || 32–18 || L1
|-style="background:#fbb;"
| 51 || September 16 || Dodgers || 5–7 || Kolarek (3–0) || Morejón (2–1) || Báez (2) || 32–19 || L2
|-style="background:#cfc;"
| 52 || September 18 || @ Mariners || 6–1 || Paddack (4–4) || Kikuchi (2–4) || — || 33–19 || W1
|-style="background:#fbb;"
| 53 || September 19 || @ Mariners || 1–4 || Sheffield (4–3) || Altavilla (1–3) || Hirano (3) || 33–20 || L1
|-style="background:#cfc;"
| 54 || September 20 || @ Mariners || 7–4  || Rosenthal (1–0) || Sadler (1–1) || — || 34–20 || W1
|-style="background:#fbb;"
| 55 || September 22 || Angels || 2–4 || Canning (4–2) || Davies (7–4) || Mayers (2) || 34–21 || L1
|-style="background:#fbb;"
| 56 || September 23 || Angels || 2–5 || Sandoval (1–4) || Morejón (2–2) || Peña (2) || 34–22 || L2
|-style="background:#fbb;"
| 57 || September 25 || @ Giants  || 4–5  || Anderson (4–3) || Paddack (4–5) || — || 34–23 || L3
|-style="background:#cfc;"
| 58 || September 25 || Giants  || 6–5  || Patiño (1–0) || Coonrod (0–2) || — || 35–23 || W1
|-style="background:#cfc;"
| 59 || September 26 || @ Giants || 6–2 || Stammen (4–2) || Cueto (2–3) || — || 36–23 || W2
|-style="background:#cfc;"
| 60 || September 27 || @ Giants || 5–4 || Altavilla (2–3) || Smyly (0–1) || Rosenthal (11) || 37–23 || W3
|-

|- style="text-align:center;"
| Legend:       = Win       = Loss       = PostponementBold = Padres team member

Roster

Postseason

Game log

|- style="background:#fbb;"
| 1 || September 30 || Cardinals || 4–7 || Gallegos (1–0) || Paddack (0–1) || Reyes (1) || 0–1 || L1
|- style="background:#cfc;"
| 2 || October 1 || Cardinals || 11–9 || Pagán (1–0) || Ponce de Leon (0–1) || Rosenthal (1) || 1–1 || W1
|- style="background:#cfc;"
| 3 || October 2 || Cardinals || 4–0 || Adams (1–0) || Flaherty (0–1) || — || 2–1 || W2 
|-

|- style="background:#fbb;"
| 1 || October 6 || @ Dodgers || 1–5 || May (1–0) || Richards (0–1) || — || 0–1 || L1
|- style="background:#fbb;"
| 2 || October 7 || @ Dodgers || 5–6 || Kershaw (1–0) || Davies (0–1) || Kelly (1) || 0–2 || L2
|- style="background:#fbb;"
| 3 || October 8 || Dodgers || 3–12 || Urías (1–0) || Morejón (0–1) || — || 0–3 || L3
|-
| colspan=9|
|-

Wild Card Series

Game 1 
The Padres started young right hander Chris Paddack against Cardinals lefty Kwang Hyun Kim. The Cardinals got to Paddack early, when Paul Goldschmidt hit a 2-run home run, Yadier Molina singled in Dylan Carlson and Matt Carpenter hit a sacrifice fly to make it 4-0 Cardinals. The Padres responded with an Eric Hosmer sacrifice fly in the 1st & an Austin Nola sacrifice fly in the 2nd. However, the Cardinals would get those runs back as Paul DeJong singled in Carlson & Carpenter singled in Molina to make it 6–2. Padres responded again with a Tommy Pham RBI single. In the 6th inning, Nola made it 6–4 with a sacrifice fly that ended in a double play as Jake Cronenworth was tagged out at 3rd. Dexter Fowler capped the scoring with an RBI single in the 9th to make it 7–4. Kim only lasted  and Paddack lasted .

Game 2 
The Padres gave the ball to veteran right handed Zach Davies, while the Cardinals gave the ball to veteran Adam Wainwright. The Cardinals got to Davies early with a Molina RBI single in the 1st inning. In the 2nd, Harrison Bader singled in Carpenter and Kolten Wong hit a 2-run home run. Davies would only go 2 innings, giving up 4 runs. Cardinals starter Adam Wainwright did not fare well either, as he loaded the bases in the 4th inning with nobody out, and Wil Myers would ground into a force play to get the Padres on the board. After a Nola walk, Wainwright was pulled after . Austin Gomber relieved him and out of the jam, but not before allowing another run to cross the plate. In the 6th inning, the Cardinals struck with a Fowler RBI double and a Wong sacrifice fly. The Padres would tie the game in the bottom half of the 6th inning on back 2 back home runs from Fernando Tatís Jr. & Manny Machado. The Padres took their first lead of the series in the bottom of the 7th when Myers homered and Tatis hit his 2nd home run of the night. Back-to-back sacrifice flies got the Cardinals within a run but the Padres put away the game when Myers hit his 2nd home run of the night. Goldschmidt though, would add another home run before Padres closer Trevor Rosenthal shut the door and sent the series to a winner take all Game 3.

Game 3 
The Cardinals started ace Jack Flaherty, while the Padres went with a bullpen game. The game remained scoreless until the 5th inning, when Hosmer doubled in Tatis to get the Padres on the board first. The Padres added two more runs in the 7th inning on a fielders choice & a bases loaded walk. Cronenworth would cap off the scoring with a solo home run in the 8th inning. The Padres bullpen held the Cardinals to just 4 hits & Padres closer Trevor Rosenthal worked a 1-2-3 9th inning to send the Padres to the NLDS against the Los Angeles Dodgers.

NLDS 
The Padres faced their division rivals, the Los Angeles Dodgers in the NLDS.

Game 1 
Dodgers pitcher Walker Buehler started Game 1, while the Padres gave the ball to Mike Clevinger. Clevinger only pitched 1 inning before leaving the game with an injury. The Padres scored a run in the 4th inning on an Austin Nola RBI single. The Dodgers would respond in the 5th inning when Jake Cronenworth made a throwing error that scored Justin Turner. In the 6th inning, the Dodgers broke up a no-hitter with a double from Mookie Betts. Corey Seager hit a sacrifice fly that gave the Dodgers the lead, then Turner singled in Betts. Cody Bellinger then singled in Turner to make it 4–1. A wild pitch scored Max Muncy to make it 5-1 Dodgers. The Dodgers bullpen pitched 5 scoreless innings.

Game 2 
Dodgers lefty Clayton Kershaw started Game 2, while the Padres started right hander Zach Davies. Wil Myers got the scoring started with an RBI double. The Dodgers took the lead on a Corey Seager 2 run double and a Max Muncy RBI single. Cody Bellinger added a solo home run to make it 4–1. The Padres got back in it with back 2 back home runs from Manny Machado & Eric Hosmer. The Dodgers added two more runs on a sacrifice fly & a RBI single. Mitch Moreland brought in Jake Cronenworth in to make it 6-4 Dodgers and Trent Grisham made it a 1 run game and knocked Dodgers closer Kenley Jansen from the game. Dodgers reliever Joe Kelly then shut the door after that and put the Padres in an 0-2 NLDS hole

Game 3
The Dodgers gave the ball to flame-throwing right hander Dustin May, while the Padres gave the ball to rookie left hander Adrián Morejón. The Dodgers started the scoring with a fielder's choice RBI from Cody Bellinger in the top of the 2nd. The Padres took the lead in the bottom of the 2nd on a bases loaded walk & a Grisham RBI single. The Dodgers broke it open in the top of the 3rd when shortstop Corey Seager drove in right fielder Mookie Betts, third baseman Justin Turner drove in Seager, left fielder A. J. Pollock singled in Turner & designated hitter Joc Pederson singled in Pollock to make it 6–2. Dodgers catcher Will Smith singled in Betts to make 7–2 in the top of the 4th. Betts hit a sacrifice fly to score Pollock to make it 8–2. Dodgers lefty Julio Urías balked in Manny Machado to make 8-3 Dodgers. Smith drove in Betts & Turner to make it 10-3 & Bellinger tripled in Max Muncy & Smith in to make it 12–3. Dodgers pitching shut the Padres offense down from there as the Padres were swept.

Postseason rosters

| style="text-align:left" |
Pitchers: 14 Emilio Pagán 15 Drew Pomeranz 17 Zach Davies 25 Tim Hill 34 Craig Stammen 36 Pierce Johnson 43 Garrett Richards 47 Trevor Rosenthal 50 Adrián Morejón 54 Austin Adams 55 Matt Strahm 57 Dan Altavilla 59 Chris Paddack 62 Luis Patiño
Catchers: 11 Jason Castro 21 Luis Campusano 22 Austin Nola 
Infielders: 3 Jorge Mateo 5 Greg Garcia 9 Jake Cronenworth 13 Manny Machado 23 Fernando Tatís Jr. 30 Eric Hosmer 
Outfielders: 2 Trent Grisham 4 Wil Myers 10 Jurickson Profar 28 Tommy Pham  
Designated hitters: 18 Mitch Moreland
|- valign="top"

| style="text-align:left" |
Pitchers: 14 Emilio Pagán 15 Drew Pomeranz 17 Zach Davies 25 Tim Hill 34 Craig Stammen 36 Pierce Johnson 40 Ryan Weathers 43 Garrett Richards 47 Trevor Rosenthal 50 Adrián Morejón 54 Austin Adams 55 Matt Strahm 57 Dan Altavilla 59 Chris Paddack 62 Luis Patiño
Catchers: 11 Jason Castro 21 Luis Campusano 22 Austin Nola
Infielders: 9 Jake Cronenworth 13 Manny Machado 23 Fernando Tatís Jr. 30 Eric Hosmer
Outfielders: 2 Trent Grisham 4 Wil Myers 10 Jurickson Profar 24 Greg Allen 
Designated hitters: 18 Mitch Moreland 28 Tommy Pham
|- valign="top"

Farm system

References

External links
San Diego Padres Schedule 2020 at MLB.com
2020 San Diego Padres at Baseball-Reference.com

San Diego Padres seasons
San Diego Padres
San Diego Padres